All That (stylized as "All That") is an independent album by LeAnn Rimes under the label Nor Va Jak. Released exclusively in July 1994, the album did not sell well on the market, but a copy was given to Curb Records owner, Mike Curb, who later signed Rimes to his label and recorded her debut album, Blue (1996). All That contains the original recording of "Blue". Many songs on the album were later released on Rimes' compilation album, Unchained Melody: The Early Years (1997). The album contains covers of Dolly Parton’s “Why Can't We” and “I Will Always Love You”, though the latter is done in the style of Whitney Houston’s R&B cover. The album also has a cover of The Beatles’ “Yesterday” and Patsy Montana’s “I Want to Be a Cowboy's Sweetheart”.

Background
All That consists of songs that Rimes performed during her concerts prior to her contract with Curb Records. Rimes was eleven years old at the time she recorded the album. The album was recorded in the spring of 1994 at Norman Petty Studios in Clovis, New Mexico and was released in July of the same year. It was released on CD and cassette tape. Rimes recorded the song "Blue" which Bill Mack had passed to her. The album was sold through a regional market but it was not a best-seller. A copy was sent to all major record label owners including Mike Curb who recalled "Someone sent me her CD. I put it on and everyone just turned their heads and said, 'Who's that?'". Two years later Rimes signed her contract with Curb Records. Rimes re-recorded "Blue" and "I'll Get Even with You" on Blue (1996). Due to high sales of Blue, Curb Records used several tracks recorded on the album on Rimes' compilation album, Unchained Melody: The Early Years (1997). "Why Can't We" and "Middle Man" were re-recorded and placed on her second compilation album, God Bless America (2001). "Broken Wing" was also included on the God Bless America compilation album.

Track listing

Note
 "Share My Love" incorrectly states 3:22 on the back cover

Personnel
Credits for All That were adapted from liner notes.
Bob Smith – bass guitar
Brad Billingsley – drums
Check Rippey – fiddle
Crista Carnes – background vocals
Greg Walker – assistant producer
Johnny Mulhair – acoustic guitar, engineer, electric guitar, mandolin, producer, steel guitar
Kayla Powell – background vocals
LeAnn Rimes – lead vocals
Lisa Criss – background vocals
Paul Goad – piano, bass guitar, keyboards
Ray Carl – harmonica
Whitney Mulhair – flute
Wilbur C. Rimes – producer

References

1994 albums
LeAnn Rimes albums
Self-released albums